Nuria Quevedo Teixidó (born 18 March 1938) is a Spanish painter and graphic artist, affiliated with the Communist Party, who has lived in Berlin since age 15.

Biography
Nuria Quevedo's father, José Quevedo Fernández, was an aviator of the Spanish Republican Air Force. In 1939 he left Spain for France, along with her mother, but he soon returned to Barcelona, where he stayed until 1942. That year the whole family reunited, this time in Berlin, where her father worked for the Nazis. In 1945 mother and daughter moved to Barcelona, and in 1952 they returned to meet with their father in East Berlin, where they would settle permanently.

She worked in a bookstore owned by the family.

Several of the artist's works have been sold at auction, including Teixidó Betrachtung des Fisches, sold at the Schmidt Art Auction's "Auction 42" in 2014.

Quevedo's work is characterized by using the human figure to create her own visual language, through which she invites a reflective interpretation. A constant in her work is the use of the figure of Don Quixote, which highlights the importance of literature as a source of inspiration for her work, as shown in illustrations and engravings inspired by the novel Cassandra by Christa Wolf.

In her first works, the melancholy of the feeling of uprooting the exiles in her host cities is reflected, examples of which are her works: Els paisatges plujosos and the series Cap i mans.

Nuria Quevedo herself considers that her first works were very influenced by Solana.

In 2006 she exhibited her work for the first time in Catalonia.

In addition to being a painter, Nuria Quevedo wrote a book together with Mercedes Álvarez in 2012, published by the Museu del Pueblu d'Asturies, FMCE and UP, Ayuntamientu de Xixón, titled Ilejanía. La cercanía de lo olvidado.

Recognitions
Nuria Quevedo was awarded the Goethe Prize by the East Berlin City Council.

References

1938 births
Living people
20th-century Spanish painters
20th-century Spanish women artists
21st-century Spanish painters
21st-century Spanish women artists
Spanish women painters
East German artists
East German women
Painters from Barcelona
Spanish communists
Spanish emigrants to East Germany
People from East Berlin